
Gmina Tworóg is a rural gmina (administrative district) in Tarnowskie Góry County, Silesian Voivodeship, in southern Poland.

Villages
Gmina Tworóg contains the villages and settlements of Boruszowice, Brynek, Hanusek, Koty, Mikołeska, Nowa Wieś Tworoska, Połomia, Świniowice, Tworóg and Wojska.

Neighbouring gminas
Gmina Tworóg is bordered by the towns of Lubliniec and Tarnowskie Góry, and by the gminas of Koszęcin, Krupski Młyn, Wielowieś and Zbrosławice.

References

Tworog
Tarnowskie Góry County